In enzymology, a dextrin dextranase is an enzyme that catalyzes the chemical reaction

(1,4-alpha-D-glucosyl)n + (1,6-alpha-D-glucosyl)m  (1,4-alpha-D-glucosyl)n-1 + (1,6-alpha-D-glucosyl)m+1

Thus, the two substrates of this enzyme are (1,4-alpha-D-glucosyl)n and (1,6-alpha-D-glucosyl)m, whereas its two products are (1,4-alpha-D-glucosyl)n-1 and (1,6-alpha-D-glucosyl)m+1.

This enzyme belongs to the family of glycosyltransferases, specifically the hexosyltransferases.  The systematic name of this enzyme class is 1,4-alpha-D-glucan:1,6-alpha-D-glucan 6-alpha-D-glucosyltransferase. Other names in common use include dextrin 6-glucosyltransferase, and dextran dextrinase.

References

 
 
 

EC 2.4.1
Enzymes of unknown structure